Alberto Francesco Alesina (29 April 1957 – 23 May 2020) was an Italian political economist. Described as one of the leading political economists of his generation, he published many influential works in both the economics and political science research literature.

Background and professional life
Alesina was born in Broni, Lombardy, Italy. He obtained his undergraduate degree in economics from Bocconi University.

From 2003 to 2006, Alesina served as Chairman of the Department of Economics at Harvard University.  He was the Nathaniel Ropes Professor of Political Economy at Harvard. He visited several institutions including Massachusetts Institute of Technology (MIT), Tel Aviv University, University of Stockholm, The World Bank, and the International Monetary Fund (IMF).  In 2006, Alesina participated in the Stock Exchange of Visions project.

He published five books and edited more. His two last books were The Future of Europe: Reform or Decline (2006, MIT Press), and Fighting Poverty in the US and Europe: A World of Difference (2004, Oxford). He was a co-editor of the Quarterly Journal of Economics for eight years and associate editor of academic journals. He published columns in newspapers around the world.  He was a founding contributor of the online economic policy and research journal Voxeu.org and of Lavoce.info.

Alesina's work covered a variety of topics, including:
 Political business cycles
 The political economy of fiscal policy and budget deficits
 The process of European integration
 Stabilization policies in high inflation countries
Currency unions
 The political economic determinants of re-distributive policies
 Differences in the welfare state in the US and Europe
 Differences in the economic system in the US and Europe
 The effect of alternative electoral systems on economic policies
 The determination of the choice of different electoral systems

Alesina was a member of the National Bureau of Economic Research (Cambridge, Massachusetts), the  Centre for Economic Policy Research in London, and the Econometric Society. He was elected a Fellow of the American Academy of Arts and Sciences in 2006.

Death
Alesina died from a suspected heart attack on 23 May 2020, while hiking with his wife, Susan. In 2021, Harvard University renamed its political economy workshop in Alesina's honor.

Austerity
Alesina was an influential proponent of austerity during the Great Recession. He argued that austerity can be expansionary in situations where government reduction in spending is offset by greater increases in aggregate demand (private consumption, private investment and exports). A credible fiscal consolidation would reduce private actors' uncertainty and lower the risk premium. Assuming that Ricardian equivalence and the Permanent income hypothesis hold, actors' expected future wealth would increase and induce them to consume more.

In October 2009 Alesina and Silvia Ardagna published "Large Changes in Fiscal Policy: Taxes Versus Spending", a much-cited academic paper aimed at showing that fiscal austerity measures did not hurt economies, and actually helped their recovery. On 6 June 2013, U.S. economist and 2008 Nobel laureate Paul Krugman published "How the Case for Austerity Has Crumbled" in The New York Review of Books, noting how influential these articles have been with policymakers, describing the paper by the 'Bocconi Boys' Alesina and Ardagna (from the name of their Italian alma mater) as "a full frontal assault on the Keynesian proposition that cutting spending in a weak economy produces further weakness", arguing the reverse.

More recently, studies by the IMF and others have cast doubt on the methodological underpinning of Alesina's work, and conclude that the evidence is more likely to suggest a contractionary effect of fiscal consolidation.

Selected publications

Books
 1995. Partisan Politics, Divided Government and the Economy (with Howard Rosenthal). Cambridge. Description & TOC and preview.
  1997a. Political Cycles and the Macroeconomy (with Nouriel Roubini & Gerald D. Cohen). MIT Press.  Description and chapter-preview links.
 1997b. Designing Macroeconomic Policy for Europe (with Olivier Blanchard  et al.), CEPR, London.
 2003. The Size of Nations (with Enrico Spolaore). MIT Press. Description and chapter-preview links.
 2004. Fighting Poverty in the US and Europe: A World of Difference (with Edward Glaeser). Oxford. Description, and "slide-show" summary, and chapter-preview links via "select" click.
 2006. The Future of Europe: Reform or Decline (with Francesco Giavazzi), MIT Press. Description, Introduction , preview.

Articles

Press + to enlarge small-font links below.
 1987. "Macroeconomic Policy in a Two-Party System as a Repeated Game," Quarterly Journal of Economics, 102(3), p pp. 651–678.
 1988b. "Macroeconomics and Politics," NBER Macroeconomics Annual 1988, Volume 3, pp. 13–62.
 1991.  "Why Are Stabilizations Delayed?" (with Allan Drazen), American Economic Review, 81(5), pp. 1170–1188.
 1993. "Central Bank Independence and Macroeconomic Performance: Some Comparative Evidence" (with Lawrence H. Summers), Journal of Money, Credit and Banking, 25(2), p pp. 151–162.
 1994. "Distributive Politics and Economic Growth" (with Dani Rodrik), Quarterly Journal of Economics, 109(2), p pp. 465–490.
 1995. "The Political Economy of Budget Deficits" (with Roberto Perotti), IMF Staff Papers, 42(1), pp. pp. 1–31.
 1996a. "Political Instability and Economic Growth" (with Sule Özler et al.), Journal of Economic Growth, 1(2),  p pp. 189–211

 1996b. "Income Distribution, Political Instability, and Investment," (with Roberto Perotti), European Economic Review, 40(6), pp. 1203–1228. Abstract.
 1997. "On the Number and Size of Nations" (with Enrico Spolaore), Quarterly Journal of Economics, 112(4),  p pp. 1027–1056.
 1999. "Public Goods and Ethnic Divisions" (with Reza Baqir & William Easterly), Quarterly Journal of Economics, 114(4), pp. 1243–1284. 
 2000a. "Who Gives Foreign Aid to Whom and Why?" (with David Dollar), Journal of Economic Growth, 5(1), p pp. 33–63.
 2000b. "Participation in Heterogeneous Communities" (with Eliana La Ferrara), Quarterly Journal of Economics, 115(3), p pp. 847–904.
 2002a. "Who Trusts Others?" Journal of Public Economics, 85(2), pp.  207–234 (close Pages tab).
 2002b. "Fiscal Policy, Profits, and Investment" (with Silvia Ardagna et al.), American Economic Review, 92(3), pp. 571–589.
 2003. "Fractionalization" (with Arnaud Devleeschauwer et al.), Journal of Economic Growth, 8(2), p pp. 155–194.
 2004. "Inequality and Happiness: Are Europeans and Americans Different?" (with Rafael Di Tellab and Robert MacCulloch), Journal of Public Economics, 88(9–10), pp. 2009–2042 (close Bookmarks tab).
 2005a. "International Unions" (with Ignazio Angeloni and Federico Etro), American Economic Review, 95(3), p pp. 602–615.
 2005b. "Ethnic Diversity and Economic Performance" (with Eliana La Ferrara), Journal of Economic Literature, 43(3), pp. 762–800.
 2007:3. "Political Economy," NBER Reporter, pp. 1–5 (press +).
 2010. "Large Changes in Fiscal Policy: Taxes versus Spending" (with Silvia Ardagna), in J. R. Brown, ed., Tax Policy and the Economy, v. 24, ch. 2, pp. 35–68. 
2013. "On the Origins of Gender Roles: Women and the Plough" (with Paola Giuliano and Nathan Nunn), Quarterly Journal of Economics. 2013; 128 (2) : 469–530.
 2015. "The Output Effect of Fiscal Consolidations" (with Carlo Favero and Francesco Giavazzi), Journal of International Economics, vol 96, pages S19-S42. 
 2016. "Ethnic Inequality" (with Stelios Michalopoulos and Elias Papaioannou), Journal of Political Economy, vol. 124(2), pages 428-488 
 2016. "Birthplace Diversity and Economic Prosperity" (with Johann Harnoss and Hillel Rapoport), Journal of Economic Growth'', vol. 21(2), pages 101-138

References

External links
 Harvard Faculty page.
 Alberto Alesina at CSA Celebrity Speakers
 Stock Exchange Of Visions: Visions of Alberto Alesina (Video Interviews)
 Web site of Voxeu.org
 Web site of LaVoce.info
 Alberto Alesina talks about his new book, "The Future of Europe" with Jenny Attiyeh on the interview program ThoughtCast!

1957 births
2020 deaths
20th-century  Italian economists
21st-century  Italian economists
Bocconi University alumni
Carnegie Mellon University faculty
Fellows of the American Academy of Arts and Sciences
Fellows of the Econometric Society
Harvard University alumni
Harvard University faculty
Italian emigrants to the United States
Labor economists
National Bureau of Economic Research
People from Broni
Place of death missing
Massachusetts Institute of Technology faculty